The Italian city-states were numerous political and independent territorial entities that existed on the Italian Peninsula from the beginning of the Middle Ages until the proclamation of the Kingdom of Italy, which took place in 1861.

After the fall of the Western Roman Empire, urban settlements in Italy generally enjoyed a greater continuity than settlements in western Europe. Many of these cities were survivors of earlier Etruscan, Umbrian and Roman towns which had existed within the Roman Empire. The republican institutions of Rome had also survived. 

Some feudal lords existed with a servile labour force and huge tracts of land, but by the 11th century, many cities, including Venice, Milan, Florence, Genoa, Pisa, Lucca, Cremona, Siena, Città di Castello, Perugia, and many others, had become large trading metropoles, able to obtain independence from their formal sovereigns.

Early Italian city-states

Among the earliest city-states of Italy, that already started to emerge in the 7th century, were the Duchy of Naples, Duchy of Amalfi, Gaeta and the Republic of Venice which, although nominally under Byzantine control, were effectively independent. The Duchy of Spoleto and the Duchy of Benevento were under Lombard control.

Communes
The other early Italian city-states to appear in northern and central Italy arose as a result of a struggle to gain greater autonomy during the rule of the Holy Roman Empire. The Lombard League was an alliance that included at its apex most of the cities of northern Italy including Milan, Piacenza, Cremona, Mantua, Crema, Bergamo, Brescia, Bologna, Padua, Treviso, Vicenza, Verona, Lodi, Reggio Emilia and Parma, although its membership changed through time. Other city-states were associated to these "commune" cities, like Genoa, Turin and, in central Italy, the city states of Florence, Pisa, Lucca, Siena, Ancona, Città di Castello, Perugia, Assisi among others.

Duchies
South of Rome and the Papal States were the duchies of Salerno, Amalfi, Duchy of Naples and Duchy of Gaeta. Other independent cities were Bari and Trani, which in 1130 were united in the newly created Norman Kingdom of Sicily.

Maritime republics

Amalfi, Gaeta and Venice in the 11th century were already autonomous maritime republics. Around 1100, Genoa, Pisa and Ancona emerged as independent maritime republics too: trade, shipbuilding and banking helped support their powerful navies in the Mediterranean in those medieval centuries.

Difference from northern Europe

Between the 12th and 13th centuries, Italy was vastly different from feudal Europe north of the Alps. The Peninsula was a melange of political and cultural elements, not a unified state.

Marc Bloch and Fernand Braudel have argued that geography determined the history of the region; other scholars emphasize the absence of central political structures. The very mountainous nature of Italy's landscape was a barrier to effective inter-city communication. The Po plain was an exception: it was the only large contiguous area, and most city states that fell to invasion were located there. Those that survived the longest were in the more rugged regions, such as Florence or Venice, which was protected by its lagoon. 

The rugged terrain of the Alps prevented the Holy Roman Emperors or various German princes and lords from attacking the northern part of Italy, safeguarding the country from permanent German political control. Largely for these reasons, no strong monarchies emerged as they did in the rest of Europe. Authority of the Holy Roman Empire over northern Italian territory, especially after the year 1177, was de facto only nominal. Instead emerged the autonomous (sometimes de facto independent) city-states.

While those Roman, urban, republican sensibilities persisted, there were many movements and changes afoot. Italy first felt the changes in Europe from the 11th to the 13th centuries. Typically there was:
 a rise in population―the population doubled in this period (the demographic explosion)
 an emergence of huge cities (Venice, Florence and Milan had over 100,000 inhabitants by the 13th century in addition to many others such as Genoa, Bologna and Verona, which had over 50,000 inhabitants)
 the rebuilding of the great cathedrals
 substantial migration from country to city (in Italy the rate of urbanization reached 20%, making it the most urbanized society in the world at that time)
 an agrarian revolution
 the development of commerce

In recent writing on the city states, American scholar Rodney Stark emphasizes that they married responsive government, Christianity and the birth of capitalism.  He argues that these states were mostly republics, unlike the great European monarchies of France and Spain, where absolute power was vested in rulers who could and did stifle commerce.  Keeping both direct Church control and imperial power at arm's length, the independent city republics prospered through commerce based on early capitalist principles, ultimately creating the conditions for the artistic and intellectual changes produced by the Renaissance.

Cambridge University historian and political philosopher Quentin Skinner has pointed out how Otto of Freising, a German bishop who visited central Italy during the 12th century, commented that Italian towns had appeared to have exited from feudalism, so that their society was based on merchants and commerce. Even northern cities and states were also notable for their merchant republics, especially the Republic of Venice.  Compared to absolutist monarchies or other more centrally controlled states, the Italian communes and commercial republics enjoyed relative political freedom conducive to academic and artistic advancement. Geographically, and because of trade, Italian cities such as Venice became international trading and banking hubs and intellectual crossroads.

Harvard historian Niall Ferguson points out that Florence and Venice, as well as several other Italian city-states, played a crucial innovative role in world financial developments, devising the main instruments and practices of banking and the emergence of new forms of social and economic organization.

Income

It is estimated that the per capita income of northern Italy nearly tripled from the 11th century to the 15th century. This was a highly mobile, demographically expanding society, fueled by rapidly expanding commerce.

In the 14th century, just as the Italian Renaissance was beginning, Italy was the economic capital of Western Europe: the Italian States were the top manufacturers of finished woolen products. With the Bubonic Plague in 1348, the birth of the English woolen industry, and general warfare, Italy temporarily lost its economic advantage. By the late 15th century Italy was again in control of trade along the Mediterranean Sea. It found a new niche in luxury items like ceramics, glassware, lace and silk as well as experiencing a temporary rebirth in the woolen industry.

Italy never regained its strong hold on textiles. Though it was the birthplace of banking, by the 16th century German and Dutch banks began taking away business. The discovery of the Americas as well as new trade routes to Africa and India by the Portuguese, which made Portugal the leading trading power, brought about the shift of economic power from Italy to Portugal in the 16th century, from Portugal to the Netherlands in the 17th century, and from the Netherlands to the United Kingdom in the 18th century.

Literacy and numeracy
By the 13th century, northern and central Italy had become the most literate society in the world. More than one-third of the male population could read in the vernacular (an unprecedented rate since the decline of the Western Roman Empire), as could a small but significant proportion of women.

The Italian city states were also highly numerate, given the importance of the new forms of bookkeeping that were essential to the trading and mercantile basis of society. Some of the most widely circulating books, such as the Liber Abaci by Leonardo Fibonacci of Pisa, included applications of mathematics and arithmetic to business practice or were business manuals based on sophisticated numeracy. 

Indeed, Luca Pacioli helped create the banking system of the Italian city-states with double-entry bookkeeping. His 27-page treatise on bookkeeping contained the first known published work on that topic, and is said to have laid the foundation for double-entry bookkeeping (of Genoese merchants) as it is practised today.

Communes

During the 11th century in northern Italy a new political and social structure emerged: the city-state or commune. The civic culture which arose from this urbs was remarkable. In some places where communes arose (e.g. Britain and France), they were absorbed by the monarchical state as it emerged.  They survived in northern and central Italy as in a handful of other regions throughout Europe to become independent and powerful city-states. 

In Italy the breakaway from their feudal overlords occurred in the late 12th century and 13th century, during the Investiture Controversy between the Pope and the Holy Roman Emperor: Milan led the Lombard cities against the Holy Roman Emperors and defeated them, gaining independence (battles of Legnano, 1176, and Parma, 1248; see Lombard League).

Some Italian city-states became great military powers very early on. Venice and Genoa acquired vast naval empires in the Mediterranean and Black Seas, some of which threatened those of the growing Ottoman Empire. During the Fourth Crusade (1204), Venice conquered three-eights of the Byzantine Empire.

The Maritime Republics were one of the main products of this new civic and social culture based on commerce and exchange of knowledge with other areas of the world outside western Europe. The Republic of Venice and the Republic of Genoa for example, had important trade communications with the Muslim and Byzantine world and this helped the initial development of the Italian Renaissance.

By the late 12th century, a new and remarkable society had emerged in Northern Italy; rich, mobile, expanding, with a mixed aristocracy and urban borghese (burgher) class, interested in urban institutions and republican government. But many of the new city-states also housed violent factions based on family, confraternity and brotherhood, which undermined their cohesion (for instance the Guelphs and Ghibellines).

Princely states

By 1300, most of these republics had become princely states dominated by a Signore. The exceptions were the Republics of Venice, Florence, Genoa, Lucca, and a few others, which remained republics in the face of an increasingly monarchic Europe. In many cases by 1400 the Signori were able to found a stable dynasty over their dominated city (or group of regional cities), obtaining a nobility title of sovereignty by their formal superior. For example in 1395 Gian Galeazzo Visconti bought the title of Duke of Milan from the King Wenceslaus for 100,000 gold florins.

Regional states
In the fourteenth and fifteenth centuries, Milan, Venice, and Florence were able to conquer other city-states, creating regional states. The 1454 Peace of Lodi ended their struggle for hegemony in Italy, attaining a balance of power (see Italian Renaissance).

At the beginning of the 16th century, apart from some city-states like Genoa, Lucca or San Marino, only the Republic of Venice was able to preserve its independence and to match the European monarchies of France and Spain and the Ottoman Empire (see Italian Wars).

See also
 History of Italy
 Medieval commune
 Repubbliche Marinare
 Guelphs and Ghibellines
 Italian Renaissance
 San Marino
 Vatican City
 List of historic states of Italy

Citations

References
 "Background to the Italian Renaissance", Washington State University
 "The Rise of the Italian City-States"
 "Italy's City-States", End of Europe's Middle Ages, University of Calgary
 "City-states in Italy", Web Gallery of Art
 Waley, Daniel; Dean, Trevor (2022). The Italian City-Republics. Routledge (fifth edition)
 Jones, Philip (1997). The Italian City-State. From Commune to Signoria. Oxford: Clarendon Press
 

 

it:Città-stato italiane